Crozier Island is one of three islands located in the Kennedy Channel section of Nares Strait in the high Arctic. It is part of the Avannaata municipality, Greenland.

Geography
Located to the SW of Franklin Island off Lafayette Bay of the Washington Land coast, Crozier Island is the southernmost island of the Kennedy Channel group, the other ones being Franklin Island and Hans Island. The former is also part of Greenland, whilst the latter's ownership is shared between Greenland and Canada.

Crozier Island is named after the Irish-born, British naval officer Francis Rawdon Moira Crozier, second-in-command (and commander after Franklin's death) of John Franklin's ill-fated Naval Northwest Passage Expedition, 1845–1848, by Elisha Kent Kane between 1854 and 1855 during his second Grinnell Expedition, after it was sighted by Hans Hendrik and the American William Morton in June 1854.

See also 
 List of islands of Greenland

References 

Islands of Greenland